Chris Busby is an Irish rugby referee. He is a member of Ireland's referee High Performance Panel.

Career

Busby, born in Antrim, County Antrim, has been refereeing for over 7 years.

References

Living people
Irish rugby union referees
People from Antrim, County Antrim
United Rugby Championship referees
Year of birth missing (living people)